Benjamin Andrew (December 16, 1790) was an American planter and statesman from Midway, Georgia.

Benjamin was the son of John Andrew and was born in Dorchester County, South Carolina. In 1754 he moved to Georgia and started his plantation near Midway in what is now Liberty County.

Andrew served on the Governor's Council in John Houstoun's rebel government in 1778 and in 1779 he was president of the council. When a royal government was revived in 1780 (at least in Savannah), they declared him a traitor. That same year the revolutionary government elected him as a delegate for Georgia to the Continental Congress, but he could not attend.

Andrew was later elected to the Georgia House of Representatives, and died on the floor of the House in Augusta, which was the state capital in 1790.

External links

1713 births
1790 deaths
People from Midway, Georgia
People from Dorchester County, South Carolina
People of Georgia (U.S. state) in the American Revolution
Members of the Georgia House of Representatives
American planters
18th-century American politicians